Henry Cassorte Smith (June 2, 1856 – December 7, 1911) was a politician from the U.S. state of Michigan.
Smith was born in Canandaigua, New York and in the following year moved with his father to a farm near Palmyra, Michigan.  He attended the common schools and graduated from Adrian College in 1878.  He taught school, studied law, and was admitted to the bar on September 25, 1880.  He commenced practice in Adrian where he became city attorney.  

Smith was a delegate to the 1896 Republican National Convention.  Two years later he was elected as a Republican from Michigan's 2nd congressional district to the 56th United States Congress, after defeating the Republican incumbent in the primary. He was re-elected to the 57th Congress in 1900, serving from March 4, 1899 to March 3, 1903. He was an unsuccessful candidate for re-nomination in 1902, losing in the Republican primary election to Charles E. Townsend.

Smith resumed the practice of law in Adrian, where he resided until his death. He was interred in Oakwood Cemetery.

References

Political Graveyard

1856 births
1911 deaths
Adrian College alumni
Burials in Michigan
People from Adrian, Michigan
Politicians from Canandaigua, New York
Republican Party members of the United States House of Representatives from Michigan
19th-century American politicians
20th-century American politicians